Hajen som visste för mycket (The Shark Who Knew Too Much) is a 1989 Swedish comedy film directed by Claes Eriksson and the second to star the members of Galenskaparna och After Shave.

Plot 
The rich builder Samuel Plottner (Claes Eriksson) catches on when his son Joakim (Anders Eriksson) write a newspaper article entitled "Eternit sheets makes you slimmer". The headline makes Eternit sheet manufacturer Davidsson & Locks shares skyrocket and everyone wants to know what Joakim knows.

Joakim claims that the whole thing was a printing error, the article was about cooking and that the title would be "Lasagna sheets makes you slimmer". But he also has a secret. He and his two brothers, Alexander and Lukas are really the same person, something that only he and their mother, Desiree knows.

The "shark" in the title is alluding to "finance sharks" (sly and dishonest business men).

Cast 
 Anders Eriksson - Joakim Plottner
 Claes Eriksson - Samuel Plottner
 Kerstin Granlund - Dixie Hopper
 Jan Rippe - Helge Lock
 Peter Rangmar - Lennart Cumberland-Brons
 Per Fritzell - Benny Hörnsteen
 Knut Agnred - Reverend Himmler
 Håkan Johannesson - Jorgen Lycke
 Charlotte Strandberg - Cilly Cumberland-Brons 
 Rolf Allan Håkansson - The Architect
 Laila Westersund - The lady on the street
 Charles Falk - High Guard

Tenacious trial 
In 2007, a lingering lawsuit was settled regarding the film Hajen som visste för mycket. Claes Eriksson reported TV4 when they found advertising in his film without his permission. Eriksson won over TV4, but the TV channel continued appeal until the matter was taken up by the Supreme Court. Eriksson won even there when the court said that TV4 violated Claes Eriksson through commercials.

See also 
 Galenskaparna och After Shave
 The movie soundtrack Hajen som visste för mycket

External links 

 
 
 Kulturtuben – Hajen som visste för mycket
 Hajen som visste för mycket på GAS-wikin

1989 comedy films
1989 films
Films set in Sweden
Films directed by Claes Eriksson
Films with screenplays by Claes Eriksson
Galenskaparna och After Shave films
Swedish comedy films
1980s Swedish films